Raoul Petre Baicu (born 5 April 2000) is a Romanian professional footballer who plays as a forward.

References

External links
 
 
 

2000 births
Living people
Footballers from Bucharest
Romanian footballers
Association football forwards
FC Voluntari players
Liga I players
Liga II players
CS Universitatea Craiova players
FC Astra Giurgiu players